Tomaree Battery (Fort Tomaree) was an artillery battery located on the southern side of the entrance to Port Stephens at Tomaree Head, New South Wales, Australia. The battery was built during 1941 during the Second World War as part of Fortress Newcastle and was completed in 1942.

Two 6 inch Mark VII guns in emplacements were located at the battery. Another smaller battery of two 3 pounder guns, known as Surf Battery, was also located at Tomaree Head.

References
Horner, David (1995). The Gunners. A History of Australian Artillery. Sydney: Allen & Unwin. .

External links
NSW Heritage listing
Tomaree Battery, NSW During WW2

Military history of Australia during World War II
Artillery units and formations of Australia
Military establishments in the Hunter Region
Forts in Australia
Former military installations in New South Wales